The 1989 Rutgers Scarlet Knights football team represented Rutgers University in the 1989 NCAA Division I-A football season. In their sixth and final season under head coach Dick Anderson, the Scarlet Knights compiled a 2–7–2 record while competing as an independent and were outscored by their opponents 319 to 245. The team won victories over Boston College (9-7) and Northwestern (38-27). The team's statistical leaders included Scott Erney with 2,536 passing yards, James Cann with 429 rushing yards, and Randy Jackson with 599 receiving yards.

Schedule

References

Rutgers
Rutgers Scarlet Knights football seasons
Rutgers Scarlet Knights football